Kwak Ye-ji (born 8 September 1992) is a South Korean archer who participated at the 2010 Summer Youth Olympics in Singapore. She won the gold medal in the girls' event, defeating Tan Ya-ting of Chinese Taipei in the final. In the ranking rounds, she had fired a score of 670, a new junior world record. Kwak also won the women's recurve event at the 2009 World Cup.

References

Archers at the 2010 Summer Youth Olympics
Living people
South Korean female archers
1992 births
Youth Olympic gold medalists for South Korea
21st-century South Korean women